The Rio Branco law, also known as the Law of Free Birth, named after its champion, Prime Minister José Paranhos, Viscount of Rio Branco, was passed by the Brazilian Parliament on September 28 in 1871. It was intended to provide freedom to all newborn children of slaves, and slaves of the state or crown. Slaveholders of the children's parents were to provide care for the children until the age of 21, or turn them over to the state in return for monetary compensation.

The law was the beginning of an abolition movement in Brazil, but it turned out to be more of a legal loophole than a radical measure. Only a few people were freed under the law, while more than one million people continued to be held as slaves. This law had more of an influence in the northern part of the country, which was leaning toward wage rather than slave labor.

Many of those freed under the Rio Branco law migrated to the north to work for wages on the plantations. The Rio Branco law was the first step toward abolition of slavery in Brazil.

See also
Freedom of wombs
Partus sequitur ventrem
Slave Trade Acts
Abolitionism in Brazil

References

1871 in law
Legal history of Brazil
1871 in Brazil
Slavery in Brazil
Abolitionism in Brazil
Slavery legislation

pt:Abolicionismo no Brasil#Lei do Ventre Livre